Kayenlyk (Qayınlıq) is a rural locality (a village) in Yunnovsky Selsoviet, Ilishevsky District, Bashkortostan, Russia. The population was 80 as of 2010. There are 3 streets.

Geography 
Kayenlyk is located 9 km east of Verkhneyarkeyevo (the district's administrative centre) by road. Irmashevo is the nearest rural locality.

References 

Rural localities in Ilishevsky District